The Little Rock Trojans women's basketball team represents the University of Arkansas at Little Rock in Little Rock, Arkansas, United States. The school will join the Ohio Valley Conference (OVC) on July 1, 2022 after 31 seasons in the Sun Belt Conference.

History
Little Rock has won the West Division in the Sun Belt in 2008, 2009, 2010, and 2013. They won the Sun Belt Conference Tournament in 2011, 2012, and 2015. They have made the WNIT in 2008, 2009, and 2013. They made the Second Round of the NCAA Tournament in 2010 beating Georgia Tech 63–53. They lost to Oklahoma 60–44 in the subsequent game. They made the Second Round in 2015 after beating Texas A&M 69–60. They lost 57–54 to Arizona State in the subsequent game. As of the end of the 2015–16 season, the Trojans have an all-time record of 384–485, with a 288–231 record since joining Division I in 1999.

NCAA tournament results

References

External links